Pronie  (German Prohnen) is a village in the administrative district of Gmina Stary Dzierzgoń, within Sztum County, Pomeranian Voivodeship, in northern Poland.

Gut Prohnen was an independent village, owned by Willi Klempnauer and his wife Lucie. They also owned the Gut Schönfelde, west of Preußig Mark, now Przezmark.

Prohnen was a farm with about 285 ha, first noted in documents of the German Order of Knights in Marienburg at 1320. 

At the end of World War II Prohnen was a well-functioning farm with 200 head of dairy cows, a substantial stock of Trakehnen horses, Merino sheep and swine production.

The farm was only possible to exist and function because of its capable workforce of 18 families that had a good and rewarding life on this  estate.

Eighteen members of this estate lost their lives in World War II or were taken to Russia. The owners stayed in or around Prohnen until August 1945, when they were asked to leave Poland.      

The village has a population of 160.

See also
History of Pomerania

References

Pronie